The Strategic Air Command & Aerospace Museum is a museum focusing on aircraft and nuclear missiles of the United States Air Force during the Cold War. It is located near Ashland, Nebraska, along Interstate 80 southwest of Omaha. The objective of the museum is to preserve and display historic aircraft, missiles, and space vehicles, and provide educational resources.

History

Offutt Air Force Base, south of Omaha and adjacent to Bellevue, Nebraska. became the headquarters of the United States Air Force's Strategic Air Command in 1948, and continues as the headquarters of U.S. Strategic Command. The museum, then located at Offutt, began with its first airplane in 1959 as the Strategic Aerospace Museum. General Curtis LeMay's vision of a museum that preserved historic aircraft had become a reality. Over the following years, the outdoor museum's name changed to the Strategic Air Command Museum or SAC Museum. Ownership of the museum transferred from the Air Force to the state of Nebraska in 1970.

On May 16, 1998, after a $33 million grass roots capital campaign, the museum moved indoors to a location more accessible to the public, between Omaha and Lincoln, that allowed the aircraft to be protected from the elements to which they had previously been exposed. As part of the moving process, two aircraft (a Douglas C-124 Globemaster II and C-133 Cargomaster) were relocated to the Air Mobility Command Museum at Dover Air Force Base, Delaware.

The new museum building is a $29.5 million,  structure that features a glass atrium, two large aircraft display hangars, a traveling exhibit area, a children's interactive gallery, a 200-seat theater, a museum store, an aircraft restoration gallery, and a snack bar. The glass atrium is constructed of 525 glass panels that encase a pedestal-mounted Lockheed SR-71 Blackbird. The two aircraft display hangars protect the aircraft collection and exhibits from harsh outdoor elements. The museum participates in an exhibit exchange program with other national museums and displays them in the traveling exhibit area. Three large missiles are displayed vertically outdoors in front of the museum.

On June 15, 2001, the name of the Strategic Air Command (SAC) Museum was officially changed to the Strategic Air & Space Museum. This change incorporated the museum's rich past while attempting to reach a larger audience through dynamic programming and exciting educational programs that seek to captivate the interests and imaginations of everyone. On June 25, 2015, the museum announced another name change to the Strategic Air Command & Aerospace Museum, in an effort to reconnect to the museum's original mission of preserving the history of the Strategic Air Command while promoting interest in aviation and science among the general public.

Collection

Aircraft 

 Avro Vulcan B.2 XM573
 Boeing B-17G Flying Fortress 44-83559
 Boeing B-47E Stratojet 52-1412
 Boeing EC-135C 63-8049
 Boeing KC-97G Stratofreighter 53-0198
 Boeing RB-52B Stratofortress 52-8711
 Boeing TB-29 Superfortress 44-84076
 Convair B-36J 52-2217
 Convair B-58A Hustler 61-2059
 Convair F-102A Delta Dagger 54-1405
 Convair T-29A 50-0190
 Douglas A-26B Invader 44-34665
 Douglas C-47A Skytrain 43-48098
 Douglas C-54D Skymaster 42-72724
 Fairchild C-119G Flying Boxcar 51-8024L
 General Dynamics FB-111A Aardvark 68-0267
 Grumman HU-16B Albatross 51-0006
 Lockheed F-117 Nighthawk 85-0831
 Lockheed T-33A 58-0548
 Lockheed U-2C 56-6701
 Lockheed SR-71A Blackbird 61-7964
 Martin B-57E Canberra 55-4244
 McDonnell XF-85 Goblin 46-0524
 McDonnell F-101B Voodoo 59-0462
 McDonnell RF-4C Phantom II 65-0903
 Mikoyan-Gurevich MiG-21F-13 60-2105
 North American JTB-25N Mitchell 44-30363
 North American TB-25N Mitchell 44-28738 – Fuselage only
 North American F-86H Sabre 53-1375
 North American RB-45C Tornado 48-0017
 North American T-39A Sabreliner 62-4487
 Piasecki CH-21B 52-8676
 Republic F-84F Thunderstreak 51-1714
 Republic F-105D Thunderchief 61-0069
 Rockwell B-1A Lancer 76-0174
 Sikorsky H-19B Chickasaw 53-4426

Rockets and missiles 

 Boeing AGM-86B ALCM
 Chance Vought SLV-1 Blue Scout
 Convair SM-65D Atlas
 Douglas PGM-17A Thor
 McDonnell GAM-72 Quail
 Northrop SM-62 Snark
 North American GAM-77 Hound Dog

Spacecraft 

 Apollo Block I Command Module CSM-009 – Flown on AS-201
 Apollo Boilerplate Command Module
 NASA X-38
 Project Vela Satellite

References

External links

Aerospace museums in Nebraska
Museum
Museums established in 1959
Air force museums in the United States
Museums in Cass County, Nebraska
1959 establishments in Nebraska